Alanna Smith (born 10 September 1996) is an Australian professional basketball who for the Chicago Sky of the Women's National Basketball Association (WNBA). She played college basketball for the Stanford Cardinal.

Smith was a member of the Australian Women's basketball team (Opals) at the 2020 Tokyo Olympics. The Opals were eliminated after losing to the USA in the quarterfinals.

College career
Smith played four seasons of college basketball at Stanford University in Stanford, California for the Cardinal.

Statistics 

|-
| style="text-align:left;"| 2015–16
| style="text-align:left;"| Stanford
| 34 || 0 || 11.8 || .432 || .333|| .659 || 2.4 || 0.4 || 0.1 || 0.7 || 1.2 || 5.3
|-
| style="text-align:left;"| 2016–17
| style="text-align:left;"| Stanford
| 38 || 3 || 19.3 || .465 || .317 || .689 || 5.4 || 0.9 || 0.6 || 1.6 || 1.1 || 9.1
|-
| style="text-align:left;"| 2017–18
| style="text-align:left;"| Stanford
| 35 || 35 || 28.4 || .474 || .302 || .531 || 7.0 || 1.2 || 1.2 || 1.7 || 2.5 || 13.5
|-
| style="text-align:left;"| 2018–19
| style="text-align:left;"| Stanford
| 36 || 36 || 29.2 || .515 || .397 || .730 || 8.6 || 1.9 || 1.0 || 2.1 || 2.4 || 19.4
|-
| style="text-align:center;" colspan="2"| Career
| 143 || 74 || 22.3 || .482 || .352 || .663 || 5.9 || 1.1 || 0.7 || 1.5 || 1.8 || 11.9

Professional career

WNBA
Smith was selected as the eighth overall pick of the 2019 WNBA draft by the Phoenix Mercury. After making the final roster with the Mercury, Smith would play under head coach Sandy Brondello and alongside the likes of Brittney Griner, DeWanna Bonner and Diana Taurasi.

WNBL
After a season abroad in South Korea, Smith returned home to Australia after signing with the Adelaide Lightning for the 2020–21 WNBL season.

National team career

Youth level
Smith made her international debut for the Sapphires at the 2011 FIBA Oceania Under-16 Championship in Canberra. Smith represented the Sapphires at the Under-17 World Championship in the Netherlands the following year, where they finished in fifth place. Smith then made her debut for the Gems at the 2014 FIBA Oceania Under-18 Championship in Fiji. Smith represented the Gems at the Under-19 World Championship in Russia the following year, where they finished in third place and took home the bronze medal. She also earned a spot on the All-Tournament Team, awarded to the five strongest players of the tournament.

Senior level
At age 20, Smith was selected to the Opals team that competed in the 2017 FIBA Women's Asia Cup in India.  She made an immediate impact, averaging 10.8 points and 5.3 rebounds (2nd and 3rd-highest in the team, respectively) in 14.5 minutes per game, helping Australia finish the tournament as runners-up and qualify for the World Cup the following year.  Her best game was the quarter final, in which she amassed 20 points and 9 rebounds in just 15 minutes of court time.  
In 2018, Smith represented the Opals in her first major international tournament – the 2018 FIBA Women's Basketball World Cup, held in Tenerife, Spain.  She averaged 14.4 minutes of court time for 6.3 points and 2.3 rebounds per game, with her best game yielding 10 points and 5 rebounds (vs Argentina). She also scored 10 points in the final vs USA.

Smith, like all the other members of the 2020 Tokyo Olympics Opals women's basketball team, had a difficult tournament. The Opals lost their first two group stage matches. They looked flat against Belgium and then lost to China in heartbreaking circumstances. In their last group match the Opals needed to beat Puerto Rico by 25 or more in their final match to progress. This they did by 27 in a very exciting match. However, they lost to the United States in their quarterfinal 79 to 55.

Statistics

WNBA

Regular season

|-
| align="left" | 2019
| align="left" | Phoenix
| 18 || 0 || 7.4 || .195 || .111 || .500 || 1.9 || 0.2 || 0.3 || 0.3 || 0.4 || 1.1
|-
| align="left" | 2020
| align="left" | Phoenix
| 19 || 0 || 15.6 || .422 || .233 || .690 || 3.6 || 1.2 || 0.3 || 0.8 || 1.0 || 6.1
|-
| align="left" | 2021
| align="left" | Phoenix
| 18 || 0 || 6.5 || .235 || .190 || .250 || 1.3 || 0.6 || 0.4 || 0.3 || 0.3 || 1.2
|-
| align="left" | 2022
| align="left" | Indiana
| 9 || 1 || 12.9 || .333 || .240 || .714 || 2.7 || 0.6 || 0.9 || 0.7 || 0.9 || 4.3
|-
| align="left" | Career
| align="left" | 4 years, 2 teams
| 64 || 1 || 10.4 || .333 || .206 || .643 || 2.4 || 0.7 || 0.4 || 0.5 || 0.6 || 3.0
|}

Postseason

|-
| align="left" | 2020
| align="left" | Phoenix
| 2 || 0 || 8.0 || .250 || .500 || 1.000 || 1.0 || 0.0 || 0.5 || 0.5 || 1.0 || 2.5
|-
| align="left" | 2021
| align="left" | Phoenix
| 5 || 0 || 5.2 || .400 || .400 || 1.000 || 2.0 || 0.2 || 0.2 || 0.2 || 0.4 || 3.2
|-
| align="left" | Career
| align="left" | 2 years, 1 team
| 7 || 0 || 6.0 || .368 || .429 || 1.000 || 1.7 || 0.1 || 0.3 || 0.3 || 0.6 || 3.0
|}

References

External links
 

Stanford Cardinal bio

1996 births
Living people
All-American college women's basketball players
Australian expatriate basketball people in the United States
Australian women's basketball players
Basketball players at the 2020 Summer Olympics
Indiana Fever players
Olympic basketball players of Australia
Phoenix Mercury draft picks
Phoenix Mercury players
Power forwards (basketball)
Sportspeople from Hobart
Stanford Cardinal women's basketball players
21st-century LGBT people
Australian LGBT sportspeople
Queer women